Gold(III) sulfide or auric sulfide is an inorganic compound with the formula .Auric sulfide has been described as a black and amorphous. Little evidence has been published supporting the existence of macroscopic quantities of this material.

Claims
Early investigations claimed to prepare  auric sulfide by the reaction of lithium tetrachloroaurate with hydrogen sulfide:

Similar preparations via chloroauric acid, auric chloride, or gold(III) sulfate a claimed proceed in anhydrous solvents, but water evinces a redox decomposition into metallic gold in sulfuric acid:

Conversely, cyclo-octasulfur reduces gold(III) sulfate to a mixture of gold sulfides and sulfur oxides:

Auric sulfide has also been claimed as the product when auric acetate is sonicated with cyclo-octasulfur in decalin.

Auric sulfide is claimed to react with nitric acid as well sodium cyanide.  It is claimed to dissolve in concentrated sodium sulfide solution.

See also 
 Gold(I) sulfide

References

Gold(III) compounds
Sulfides
Hypothetical chemical compounds